Japanese traditional dance describes a number of Japanese dance styles with a long history and prescribed method of performance. Some of the oldest forms of traditional Japanese dance may be among those transmitted through the  tradition, or folk dances relating to food producing activities such as planting rice and fishing, including rain dances.

 is a more reserved genre of dance that often has circling movements, and dances of the Noh theatre are of this tradition. It is heavily influenced by the elegance and sophistication of the manners often associated with the Imperial Court in Kyoto.  has more vigorous stepping movements and is more energetic, and dances of the kabuki theatre belong to this category.

Classification

There are several types of traditional Japanese dance.

The  style is reserved and typified by circling movements where the body is kept low to the ground. The  style includes folk dances performed at annual  festival events and dances that were part of traditional kabuki performances. The  style features larger movements and is typically more energetic.

Traditional dance forms in the present day have also been influenced by Western dance forms like ballet, which were introduced to Japan during the Meiji Restoration. In  ('The Heron Maiden') the dancer's role is the spirit of the heron. In classical versions, the spirit assumes a handsome, strong pose at the end of the dance. However, this classical ending was altered in later versions (which borrowed heavily from Anna Pavlova's performances of The Dying Swan) so the spirit gradually became lifeless, ultimately sinking to the floor.

Kabuki
 

 is a classical Japanese dance-drama. Kabuki theatre is known for the stylization of its drama and for the elaborate make-up worn by some of its performers.

Kabuki is therefore sometimes translated as 'the art of singing and dancing'. These are, however,  characters which do not reflect actual etymology. The kanji of 'skill' generally refers to a performer in kabuki theatre. Since the word 'kabuki' is believed to derive from the verb , meaning 'to lean' or 'to be out of the ordinary', kabuki can be interpreted as 'avant-garde' or 'bizarre' theatre. The expression  referred originally to those who were bizarrely dressed and swaggered on a street.

The history of kabuki began in 1603, when Izumo no Okuni, possibly a shrine maiden of Izumo Taisha Temple, began performing a new style of dance drama in the dry riverbeds of Kyoto, and they were then called "strange" or "unusual" (kabuki). Kabuki became a common form of entertainment in Yoshiwara, the registered red-light district in Edo. During the Genroku era, kabuki thrived. The structure of a kabuki play was formalized during this period, as were many elements of style. Conventional character types were established, as were many of the most popular and still-performed plays.

Noh 

The origin of Noh  can be traced back to as far as the thirteenth century. Noh  is a dance that is done to music that is made by flutes and small hand drums called . Noh  dances are put together by a series of forms. Forms are patterns of body movements that are done elegantly and with beauty.

There are several types of Noh  dances. A type that is neither slow nor fast is called , and is usually performed by a female dancer. In  the performer does not wear a mask and is portraying the character as being heroic. This is a very fast dance. The female version of this is called  and can be performed in various ways.  is a dance that imitates music played at the imperial court and is usually done by the main character in a Noh drama. These are the six varieties that make up the Noh  dance types.

Costumes are a major part of Noh theatre, including the Noh . Dances and play may start out slowly, so actors create flamboyant, colourful costumes to keep the audience engaged. They also dress to fit the aspects the characters represent, for example a bamboo hat worn by a character represents country life. The most important part of the Noh costumes are the masks. The Noh  masks are thought to be the most artistic masks in Japan. The masks are only worn by the main characters. The masks have neutral expressions so it is the job of the actor to bring the character to life.

is different from most other traditional dances. It is intended for entertainment on stage.  is a refined dance that has been improved throughout four centuries.

 was created directly from kabuki  before it became theater. The third part of these dances comes from the folk dances; the spinning and jumping used in folk dances was incorporated into . The last part came from a mixture of European and American culture that is found in Japan today.

 did not reach its present form until the Meiji Restoration of 1868 during a time when Western dance forms were being introduced to Japan.

Folk dances

There are a wide variety of folk dances in Japan. Folk dances are often the basis from which other dance forms developed. It was first performed and improvised by stonemasons who were constructing Sendai Castle for the  Date Masamune. The emblem of the Date clan incorporates two tree sparrows. The sparrow dance is now performed yearly in Sendai, Miyagi Prefecture at the Aoba festival in mid-May. School children in Miyagi prefecture learn and perform the sparrow dance, especially during the Obon Festival.

is a type of folk dance performed during the Obon Festival. It was originally a dance to welcome the spirits of the dead. These dances and the music that accompanies them are different for every region of Japan. Sometimes they switch direction.

The movements and gestures in a  dance often depict the history, work or geography of the region. For example,  is a coal mining work song that originates from Miike Mine in Kyushu, and the movements in the dance depict digging, cart pushing and lantern hanging.  is a sea shanty, and the movements in the dance depict net dragging and luggage hoisting.  dances may employ the use of different utensils, such as fans, small towels and wooden hand clappers.

(or ) is a refined dance form that comes from the pleasure quarters in Osaka and Kyoto. The dance style is represented by classical elements of  style such as fan movements, pantomime and circular movements. This form of dance is intended to be performed only by women.

See also 
 Contemporary dance in Japan
 Sword dance

References

External links
Japanese Music and Dance
Video: Example of Traditional Japanese Dance, Nihonbuyo

Dance in Japan
Articles containing video clips